Willis H. Flygare (July 24, 1936 – May 18, 1981) was an American physical chemist and professor at University of Illinois at Urbana–Champaign.

Background
Flygare was born in Jackson, Minnesota. He was the son of  Willis B. and Doris H. Flygare, both of whom were of Scandinavian descent.
He attended St. Olaf College in Northfield, Minnesota, from which he graduated in 1958 with majors in chemistry, physics, and mathematics. He later attended graduate school at the University of California, Berkeley, earning his Ph.D. in chemistry in 1961.

Career 
Flygare became a professor of chemistry at the University of Illinois in 1961 and stayed in that position until his premature death at age 44 of Lou Gehrig disease.  Flygare is credited with "outstanding contributions to the understanding of molecular electronic structure".

He invented a highly sensitive microwave spectrometer.

He also developed a new method based on the molecular Zeeman effect for  measurements of  molecular quadrupole moments and magnetic susceptibility anisotropies.

He received Irving Langmuir Award in 1981.

Flygare was a professor of chemistry at Illinois, a member of the National Academy of Sciences.

The University of Illinois established lectures in his name and a memorial fund.

The University of Illinois called him "one of the most creative and dynamic physical chemists in the world."

The National Academies Press called him "a great physical chemist".

Awards and distinctions 
 Guggenheim Fellowships in 1972 and 1978
 Phi Lambda Upsilon Fresenius Award in 1971
 Baekeland Medal in 1973
 Irving Langmuir Award in 1981
 elected to the National Academy of Sciences in 1974
 honorary doctorate from St. Olaf College in 1976

References

External links

 David Chandler, "Willis H. Flygare", Biographical Memoirs of the National Academy of Sciences (2005)

1936 births
1981 deaths
People from Jackson, Minnesota
American physical chemists
Members of the United States National Academy of Sciences
St. Olaf College alumni
University of California, Berkeley alumni
University of Illinois faculty
Neurological disease deaths in Illinois
Deaths from motor neuron disease
American people of Norwegian descent
Fellows of the American Physical Society